Cypsela or Kypsela was a fortress in the district of Parrhasia in ancient Arcadia, which was occupied and fortified by the Mantineians in the Peloponnesian War, in order to annoy the Lacedaemonian district Sciritis. Its site is unlocated.

References

Populated places in ancient Arcadia
Former populated places in Greece
Lost ancient cities and towns
Parrhasia